Joseph William Joiner (August 1, 1888 – June 2, 1932) was an American politician. He was a member of the Arkansas House of Representatives, serving from 1919 to 1925. He was a member of the Democratic party.

References

1932 deaths
1888 births
People from Magnolia, Arkansas
20th-century American politicians
Speakers of the Arkansas House of Representatives
Democratic Party members of the Arkansas House of Representatives